Nelson Rocha dos Santos (born 8 May 1952) is a Brazilian former sprinter who competed in the 1980 Summer Olympics and in the 1984 Summer Olympics.

References

1952 births
Living people
Brazilian male sprinters
Olympic athletes of Brazil
Athletes (track and field) at the 1980 Summer Olympics
Athletes (track and field) at the 1984 Summer Olympics
Pan American Games bronze medalists for Brazil
Athletes (track and field) at the 1975 Pan American Games
Athletes (track and field) at the 1979 Pan American Games
Athletes (track and field) at the 1983 Pan American Games
Pan American Games medalists in athletics (track and field)
Medalists at the 1979 Pan American Games
Medalists at the 1983 Pan American Games
20th-century Brazilian people